There are over a dozen lakes named Mud Lake within the U.S. state of Montana.

 Mud Lake, Beaverhead County, Montana.	
 Mud Lake, Beaverhead County, Montana.	
 Mud Lake, Beaverhead County, Montana.	
 Mud Lake, Blaine County, Montana.	
 Mud Lake, Flathead County, Montana.	
 Mud Lake, Flathead County, Montana.	
 Mud Lake, Flathead County, Montana.	
 Mud Lake, Flathead County, Montana.	
 Winona Lake, also known as Mud Lake, Flathead County, Montana.	
 Mud Lake, Granite County, Montana.	
 Mud Lake, Granite County, Montana.	
 Martin Lake, also known as Mud Lake, Hill County, Montana.	
 Mud Lake, Hill County, Montana.	
 Mud Lake, Lake County, Montana.	
 Mud Lake, Lincoln County, Montana.	
 Deep Lake, also known as Mud Lake, Lincoln County, Montana.	
 Mud Lake, Lincoln County, Montana.	
 Mud Lake, Madison County, Montana.	
 Mud Lake, Mineral County, Montana.	
 Mud Lake, Park County, Montana.	
 Mud Lake, Park County, Montana.	
 Mud Lake, Park County, Montana.	
 Mud Lake, Phillips County, Montana.	
 Mud Lake, Powell County, Montana.	
 Mud Lake, Ravalli County, Montana.	
 Mud Lake, Silver Bow County, Montana.	
 Mud Lake, Toole County, Montana.

References
 USGS-U.S. Board on Geographic Names

Lakes of Montana